Putyatin is an urban locality (an urban-type settlement) under the administrative jurisdiction of the closed town of Fokino in Primorsky Krai, Russia. Population:

References

Urban-type settlements in Primorsky Krai